The World Open is a professional ranking snooker tournament. Throughout its history, the tournament has undergone numerous revamps and name changes. It started out in 1982 as the Professional Players Tournament, but for most of the 1980s and 1990s it was known as the Grand Prix. It was renamed the LG Cup from 2001 to 2003 before reverting to the Grand Prix until 2010. Since then it has been known as the World Open.

During 2006 and 2007, it was played in a unique round-robin format, more similar to association football and rugby tournaments than the knock-out systems usually played in snooker. The knock-out format returned in 2008 with an FA Cup-style draw. The random draw was abandoned after the 2010 edition. Judd Trump is the defending champion.

History
The tournament was created in 1982 as the Professional Players Tournament by the World Professional Billiards and Snooker Association, in order to provide another ranking event. Previously, only the World Championship carried ranking points. Ray Reardon beat Jimmy White by 10 frames to 5 in the final to win the first prize of £5,000. Reardon became the oldest winner of a ranking event at the age of 50 years and 14 days. This still remains the record.

In 1984 Rothmans started sponsoring the tournament, changing its name to the Grand Prix, and moved its venue to the Hexagon Theatre in Reading. The tournament has had various sponsors and venues since. Previous sponsors include LG Electronics, who took over in 2001 and changed the tournament's name to the LG Cup. After LG withdrew their sponsorship, the Grand Prix name was revived for 2004 and was sponsored by totesport. Between 2006 and 2008 the event was sponsored by Royal London Watches.

The tournament was played at the Preston Guild Hall in 1998, at the start of the snooker season, until 2005 (moving once to Telford in 2000). Prize money for 2005 totalled £400,000, with the winner receiving £60,000.

In its original form, the tournament had a flatter structure than most tournaments, with the top 32 players all coming in at the last 64 stage (in other tournaments there are only 16 players left when the players ranked 17–32 come in, and then the 16 winners of those matches face the top 16).

These facts made it more common to see surprise results than in most other tournaments, with players such as Dominic Dale, Marco Fu, Euan Henderson and Dave Harold all surprise finalists at the time. A player from outside the top 16 has reached the final roughly half the times the contest has been played. Few of those have become consistent stars, although Stephen Hendry and John Higgins took their first ranking titles in the event. In addition, over the years, many top 16 players were eliminated in the early stages of the contest. Taking the 1996 event as an extreme case, thirteen of the top sixteen seeds failed to reach the quarter final stages, and the semi-finals featured one match between two top 16 players (Mark Williams and John Parrott) and another between two unseeded players (Euan Henderson and Mark Bennett); with Bennett and Henderson respectively winning the first two quarter final matches, a surprise finalist was guaranteed before the quarter finals had been completed.

The event moved to Scotland at the A.E.C.C. in Aberdeen for 2006, and introduced a brand new format. Players were split into groups (8 groups of 8 in qualifying, 8 groups of 6 in the final stages) and played every other player in their group once. The top 2 players progressed; the last 16 and onwards were played as a straight knock-out.

This resulted in several surprise results. Little-known players such as Ben Woollaston, Jamie Jones and Issara Kachaiwong made it through qualifying, while stars such as Graeme Dott, Stephen Hendry and Shaun Murphy failed to clear their groups.

The format was slightly tweaked for 2007, after complaints (notably from Dennis Taylor) that the system was too random. Matches increased in length from best-of-5 to best-of-7, to give the better player more chance to win. The main tie-breaker for players level on wins was changed, with frame difference now taking precedence over results between the players who are level on points. Notably, under the 2007 format, 2006 runner-up Jamie Cope would have been eliminated in the groups, as he defeated third-placed Michael Holt but had an inferior frame-difference.

The 2007 event saw fewer surprises, although 2006 World Champion Graeme Dott, 1997 World Champion Ken Doherty, defending champion Neil Robertson, seven-time World Champion Stephen Hendry, six-time World Champion Steve Davis, twice World Champion Mark Williams and 2007 World Championship finalist Mark Selby were all eliminated in the groups. The format was not continued for 2008, due to dwindling ticket sales in the early rounds.

For 2008, the event moved to the Scottish Exhibition and Conference Centre (SECC) in Glasgow. It went back to a knock-out format with no round-robin. The last 16 and beyond however was played using an FA Cup-style draw, rather than automatically pitching higher ranked players (or their conquerors) against lower-ranked players. In 2009, the event was held in Glasgow, but at another venue, the Kelvin Hall.

Following Barry Hearn's takeover of the World Professional Billiards and Snooker Association, the Grand Prix was reformatted and renamed to World Open. The event gave a chance for amateurs to play alongside professionals. The amateurs had to win 3 matches to qualify for the main draw. On 9 January 2012 it was announced, that the World Open would be held in the next five years in Haikou on the Hainan Island. In November 2014, it was announced that the tournament would not be held in the 2014/2015 season after the contract with the promoter was not renewed and a new venue was not found in time. The event returned in the 2016/2017 season and is now held in Yushan.

Winners

Records
The 1985 final between Steve Davis and Dennis Taylor is the longest one-day final in snooker history. It lasted 10 hours and 21 minutes.

In the 2005 final, John Higgins set two records:
 His century breaks in the seventh, eighth, ninth and tenth frames marked the first time a player had ever recorded centuries in four consecutive frames in a match during a ranking tournament.
 He scored 494 points without reply, the greatest number in any professional snooker tournament at that time. Currently Ronnie O'Sullivan holds the record with 556 points without reply against Ricky Walden in the 2014 Masters. Stuart Bingham now owns the unanswered points record in a ranking tournament, scoring 547 points without reply at the 2016 China Open against Sam Baird.

John Higgins, Stephen Hendry and Mark Williams are the only players to have won this tournament four times each.

Media coverage
The World Open is currently shown live on Eurosport. Prior to the event moving to China, it was aired extensively on the BBC, ever since 1984. ITV4 televised the event in 2013.

References
General

Special

 
Snooker ranking tournaments
Recurring sporting events established in 1982
1982 establishments in England
Snooker competitions in England
Snooker competitions in Scotland
Snooker competitions in China